The Louis Stokes Wing is a 1998-erected 163 foot 10-story high-rise addition to the main branch of the  15th largest public library in the country, Cleveland Public Library located in the Civic Center district of downtown Cleveland. So as not to detract from the original Group Plan Main Branch Library building, the Wing was designed to appear as if it were the reincarnation of what the library building would look like if it emerged as a modern updated structure from the classic age of architecture.  The Stokes houses the special book storage collections, the audio visual archives (videos, DVDs, CDs, etc.), the children's collections, the circulation desk, and much more for the library system. 

The building is named after Louis Stokes, a former US Congressman who served in Ohio's 11th congressional district from 1968-1998.

References

See also
 Group Plan
 Carnegie library
 List of  the largest libraries in the United States

Skyscrapers in Cleveland
Buildings and structures in Cleveland